Thumatha infantula is a moth in the  family Erebidae. It was described by Saalmüller in 1880. It is found in Madagascar.

References

Natural History Museum Lepidoptera generic names catalog

Moths described in 1880
Nudariina